Thomas Frank Emanuel (born December 4, 1942) is a former American football linebacker. He was made captain of the volunteers in 1965.  He was elected to the College Football Hall of Fame in 2004.  He played professionally for the American Football League (AFL)'s Miami Dolphins and the National Football League (NFL)'s New Orleans Saints.  He is also a member of the Tennessee Sports Hall of Fame.

College career
Emanuel played college football for the University of Tennessee Volunteers football team. In 1965, his senior season, he was elected to several All-American and All-SEC teams.

References

External links
 Tennessee Sports Hall of Fame bio

1942 births
Living people
All-American college football players
American football linebackers
College Football Hall of Fame inductees
Miami Dolphins players
New Orleans Saints players
People from Clio, South Carolina
Players of American football from South Carolina
Tampa Bay Buccaneers coaches
Tennessee Volunteers football players
Vanderbilt Commodores football coaches